Shōsuke, Shosuke or Shousuke (written:  勝介, 勝助, 章介, 彰輔 or 奨典) is a masculine Japanese given name. Notable people with the name include:

, Japanese footballer
, pen-name of Torao Kurakane, Japanese manga artist
, Japanese playwright and theatre director
, Japanese decathlete
, Japanese explorer and merchant
, Japanese actor

Japanese masculine given names